The following list includes notable people who were born or have lived in Barrington, Illinois. For a similar list organized alphabetically by last name, see the category page People from Barrington, Illinois.

Arts and culture

Politics

Sports

References

Barrington
Barrington